Marco Enrico Bossi (25 April 1861 – 20 February 1925) was an Italian organist, composer, improviser and teacher.

Life

Bossi was born in Salò, a town in the province of Brescia, Lombardy, into a family of musicians. His father, Pietro, was organist at Salò Cathedral, which has a one-manual organ built by Fratelli Serassi from 1865 (opus 684), which was restored in 2000/2001. He had two brothers, Costante Adolfo Bossi and Pietro Bossi.

He received his musical training at the Liceo Musicale in Bologna and the Milan Conservatory, where his teachers included Francesco Sangalli (piano), Amilcare Ponchielli (composition) and Polibio Fumagalli (organ).

In 1881, Bossi became director of music and organist at Como Cathedral. Nine years later, he was appointed as professor of organ and harmony at Naples Conservatory. In addition, he held directorships at conservatories in Venice (1895–1901), Bologna (1902–1911) and Rome (1916–1923), where he established and implemented the standards of organ studies that are still used in Italy today. His notable pupils included Giulio Bas, Giacomo Benvenuti, Giorgio Federico Ghedini, and Gian Francesco Malipiero. Throughout his career, Bossi made numerous international organ recital tours, which brought him in contact with well-known colleagues such as César Franck, Marcel Dupré, Alexandre Guilmant, Joseph Bonnet, Camille Saint-Saëns, Charles M. Courboin, and Karl Straube.

In November 1924, Bossi embarked on a recital tour to New York and Philadelphia, where he made important appearances at Wanamaker's department store in Philadelphia, where he played the Wanamaker Organ, the world's largest pipe organ and at Wanamaker's store in New York City which also housed a large organ. Bossi was ill during his U.S. trip. He died unexpectedly at sea while returning from the United States on February 20, 1925, and was interred at Como.

Compositions
Marco Enrico Bossi wrote more than 150 works for various genres (orchestra, five operas, oratorios, choral and chamber music, as well as pieces for piano and organ). His catalog of compositions is still largely unknown, except for his organ works.
Andrea Macinanti is recording Marco Enrico Bossi's complete organ works for Tactus label.

Organ solo
 Tempo di suonata per organo a pieno, Op. 3
 Ouverture per organo, Op. 3 No. 3
 Intermezzo tragico, Op. 10
 Scherzo in F major, Op. 49 No. 1
 Scherzo in G minor, Op. 49 No. 2
 Impromptu à la Chopin, Op. 49 No. 3
 Inno trionfale, Op. 53
 Res Severa Magnum Gaudium: Prima suite di 4 pezzi per organo, Op. 54. Includes Preludio; Allegro moderato; Corale; Fuga
 4 Pieces, Op. 59:. Includes Toccata; Pastorale; Meditazione; Offertorio
 First Sonata in D minor, Op. 60
 Fuga sul tema 'Feda a Bach''', Op. 62
 Fantaisie, Op. 64
 Marcia di processione, Op. 68
 6 Pieces, Op. 70. Includes Prélude; Musette; Choral; Scherzo; Cantabile; Alleluja Final
 Second Sonata, Op. 71
 Marche héroïque, Op. 72
 3 Pieces, Op. 74. Includes Preghiera; Siciliana; Offertorio
 Cantate Domino. Westminster Abbey - Hymne of Glory/Hymne de Gloire, Op. 76 for organ solo or organ and choirs
 Étude symphonique, Op. 78
 3 Pieces, Op. 92. Includes Chant du soir in F major; Idylle in B major; Allegretto in A-flat major
 2 Pieces, Op. 94. Includes Élevation in E-flat major; Noël in G major
 Scherzo, Op. 95
 3 Pieces, Op. 97. Includes Andante con moto; Aspiration; Grand Chœur
 5 Pieces, Op. 104. Includes Entrée Pontificale in C major; Ave Maria in F major; Offertoire in D minor; Résignationin G major; Rédemption in C major
 Missa pro sponso et sponsa, Op. 110. Includes Graduale; Offertorio; Communio; [Savoya-Petrovich.] Marcia Nuziale/Hochzeits-Marsch
 5 Pieces, Op. 113. Includes Offertorio; Graduale; Canzoncina a Maria Vergine; In memoriam; Laudate Dominum
 Thema und Variationen, Op. 115
 10 Compositions for Organ, Op. 118. Includes Preludio; Fughetta; Pastorale; Angelus à 3;  Toccata di concerto; Melodia; Invocazione; Marcia festiva; Intermezzo à 3; Finale
 Pièce héroïque in D minor, Op. 128
 Concert Piece in C minor, Op. 130
 5 Pieces in free style, Op. 132. Includes Legende in D-flat major; Trauerzug in B-flat minor;  Ländliche Szene in D major; Stunde der Weihe in B major; Stunde der Freude in C major
 Improvisation, Op. 134 No. 2
 3 Momenti francescani, Op. 140. Includes Fervore; Colloquio colle rondini; Beatitudine
 Triptico, Op. 142
 Meditazione in una cattedrale, Op. 144
 2 Morceaux caractéristiques. Includes Preghiera. Fatemi la grazia in E major; Marcia dei Bardi in A-flat major
 Intermezzo lirico in A-flat major
 Flora mistica
 Postludio in E minor
 Ave Maria
 Solo di Clarinetto
 Scherzo (terzo tempo della Sinfonia tematica)
 Rapsodia

Organ with other instruments
 Ave Maria No. 1, Op. 50, for organ, voice & violin
 Adagio in A-flat major, Op. 84, for violin and organ
 Concerto for organ, Op. 100
 1st version in B-flat minor with large orchestra
 2nd version in A minor with four horns, timpani and string orchestra
 Entrata pontificale, Op. 104 No. 1, for two organs
 Benediction nuptiale, Op. 111 No. 1, for cello and organ (1897)
 Concert Piece in C minor, Op. 130, for organ and orchestra
 Epousailles - Sposalizio, Op. 134 No. 1
 Méditation réligieuse (violino, vioncello, arpa e organo)
 Fantasia sinfonica, Op. 147, for organ and orchestra

Chamber music
 Sonata No. 1 in E minor, for violin and piano
 Siciliana e giga (in stile antico), Op. 73, for flute and piano (1905); also for small orchestra
 Romance in A-flat major, Op. 89, for cello or viola and piano (1894)
 Four Pieces in the Form of a Suite, Op. 99, for violin and piano
 Trio in D minor, Op. 107, for violin, cello and piano
 3 Feuillets d'album, Op. 111, for cello and piano
 Sonata No. 2 in C major, Op. 117, for violin and piano
 Trio sinfonico in D major, Op. 123, for violin, cello and piano
 Il Canto dell'Anima, for cello and piano
 Improvviso, for flute and piano
 Santa Caterina da Siena, "Poemetto" for violin, string quartet, harp, celesta and organ

Piano
 7 Waltzes, Op. 93 (for piano duet)
 5 Morceaux, Op. 95 [opus # doubtful]
 4 Pièces en forme d'une suite ancienne, Op. 103
 4 Morceaux, Op. 109
 Album for the Young, Op. 122. Includes Caresses; Souvenir; Scherzando; Nocturne; Babillage; Gondoliera; Valse charmante; Berceuse
 Intermezzi goldoniani, Op. 127
 6 Kinderstücke, Op. 133
 Satire musicali
 Papillons dorés

Vocal and orchestra works
 Ouverture sinfonica in E major, Op. 1, for orchestra 
 Salve Regina, Op. 8
 Siciliana e giga in stile antico, Op. 73, for small orchestra (1905); also for flute and piano
 Missa pro defunctis, Op. 83, for chorus
 Dio siete buono, Op. 98
 The Blind, Op. 112; lyric scene for baritone, choir and orchestra
  In memoriam No. 4, Op. 113. No. 4, for chorus
 Canticum canticorum, Op. 120; biblical cantata in three parts for baritone, soprano, choirs, orchestra and organ
 Il Paradiso perduto, Op. 125; sinfonic poem in a prologue and three parts for soloists, choir, orchestra and organ
 Suite in D minor, Op. 126, for timpani, percussion, harp and strings
 Intermezzi Goldoniani, Op. 127, for string orchestra
 Johanna d'Arc, Op. 135; a mystery in a prologue and three parts (12 images) for soloists, mixed choir, male choir, children's choirs (boys' and girls' parts), large orchestra and organ
 Il Viandante; lyric drama
 Sanctus et Benedictus, for alto and organ
 A Raffaello divino, for mixed choir a capella

References

Sources
 Marco Enrico Bossi: "Ancora sulla questione degli organi", in Gazetta Musicale di Milano vol. 40 no. 34 (23 August 1885), p. 203.
 Marco Enrico Bossi & Tebaldini (eds): Metodo teorico pratico per organo (Milan: Carisch, 1893/97).
 Ennio Cominetti: Marco Enrico Bossi (Sannicandro Garganico: Gioiosa Editrice, 1999).
 Federico Mompellio: Marco Enrico Bossi (Milan: Ulrico Hoepli, 1952).

External links
 
 Brief Biography of Enrico Bossi at the Naxos website
 Biographical Dictionary of the Organ | M. Enrico Bossi at www.organ-biography.info (Subscription required)
 

1861 births
1925 deaths
19th-century Italian musicians
19th-century Italian male musicians
20th-century classical composers
20th-century Italian composers
20th-century Italian male musicians
Composers for pipe organ
Italian Romantic composers
Italian classical composers
Italian male classical composers
Italian classical organists
Organ improvisers
Male classical organists
People from Salò
People who died at sea
Pupils of Amilcare Ponchielli